Michael Allen Gillespie is an American philosopher and Professor of Political Science and Philosophy at Duke University. His areas of interest are political philosophy, continental philosophy, history of philosophy, and the origins of modernity. He has published on the relationship between theology and philosophy, medieval theology, liberalism, and a number of philosophers such as Nietzsche, Hegel, Heidegger and Kant.

In his later works, Gillespie has specialized on the relationship between religion and politics. His book "The Theological Origins of Modernity" and his article "The Antitrinitarian Origins of Liberalism" revealed the extent to which modern thought is indebted to Christianity, contributing to the breaking of the cliché that modernity is a decisive break from the Middle Ages.

Works
 The Theological Origins of Modernity, University of Chicago Press, 2008. 
 Socinianism and the Political Theology of Liberalism (a chapter in the Oxford Handbook of Political Theology. Ed. M. Kessler and S. Casey)
 Hegel, Heidegger and the Ground of History
 Nihilism before Nietzsche
 Nietzsche's New Seas: Explorations in Philosophy, Aesthetics, and Politics (ed)
 Ratifying the Constitution (ed.)
 Homo Politics, Homo Economicus (ed.)

References

Sources
 On Michael Allen Gillespie
 Michael Gillespie at Duke University Website
 Review of an article by Gillespie

Living people
21st-century American philosophers
20th-century American philosophers
Continental philosophers
Existentialists
Philosophy academics
Heidegger scholars
Duke University faculty
Philosophers of nihilism
1951 births
Harvard University alumni
University of Chicago alumni